Didier Le Guillou (born 1 April 1960) is a retired French middle-distance runner who competed primarily in the 800 metres.

He reached the semi-final at the 1982 European Championships and the heats at the 1983 World Championships. He became French indoor champion in 1983.

His personal best time was 1:46.36 minutes, achieved in July 1983 in Bordeaux.

References

1960 births
Living people
French male middle-distance runners
World Athletics Championships athletes for France